Psie Pole (polish: Dog Field) is one of the five administrative districts of Wrocław, Poland. Before 1928, it was an independent city. Its functions were largely taken over on 8 March 1990 by the Municipal Office of the newly established Wrocław Municipality. The name, though, remained in use, mainly for statistical and administrative purposes.

It lies in the city's northern and northeastern parts, on the right shore of the Oder River. A part of Psie Pole is one of Wrocław's greenest neighborhoods, and its suburban location makes it an important transport hub toward Warsaw, Łódź and other locations in central Poland.

The Polish General Tadeusz Kościuszko Military University of Land Forces is located in Psie Pole.

History

Psie Pole is considered to be the site of the 1109 Battle of Hundsfeld between the Poles and the Germans, although the existence of this battle is doubted by historians because it was not mentioned until a century later.

The local parish church of Saints James and Christopher dates back to the early 13th century, and the settlement was mentioned in medieval Polish documents under its Old Polish name Pzepole (1206) and Psepole (1266).

During World War II, the Germans established and operated a female subcamp of the Gross-Rosen concentration camp in the district.

Gallery

See also
Districts of Wrocław

References

Districts of Wrocław
Former populated places in Lower Silesian Voivodeship